Julian Good-Jones (born March 2, 1997) is an American football offensive tackle for the Philadelphia Eagles of the National Football League (NFL).

Early life and education
Good-Jones was born on March 2, 1997, in Cedar Rapids, Iowa. He attended Washington High School in Cedar Rapids and was one of the top offensive line prospects in Iowa after being named first-team all-state as a senior. He was named the co-offensive most valuable player of the district and helped his team average over 40 points and 280 yards rushing each game. Good-Jones was a three-star recruit and elected to play college football at Iowa State over offers from several other schools.

Good-Jones spent his first season at Iowa State, 2015, as a redshirt. The following season, he started 11 games at right tackle and helped the team average 421.6 yards of offense per game, while being named first-team academic all-conference. In 2017, he moved to center and started all 13 games, being named honorable mention all-conference.

Good-Jones made another position change in 2018, starting all but one of his 13 games at left tackle, and the other at center. He was selected honorable mention All-Big 12. As a senior, he started 12 games at left tackle and was named first-team all-conference. He missed his team's bowl game against Notre Dame, putting an end to his 49-game consecutive start streak which lasted from the second game of his freshman season to the second-to-last game of his senior year. His streak was the longest in school history and one of the longest in FBS history.

Professional career
After going unselected in the 2020 NFL Draft, Good-Jones was signed by the Philadelphia Eagles as an undrafted free agent. He was released during the roster cuts period. In 2021, Good-Jones was signed by the Calgary Stampeders of the Canadian Football League (CFL) and appeared in seven regular season games, as well as one postseason.

Good-Jones returned to the Stampeders in 2022 and started 15 games while helping the team have the best offense in the league. The Calgary line only allowed 17 sacks while the team averaged 6.4 yards per rush and 135.3 rushing yards per game, both leading the league by a wide margin. 

Shortly after the 2022 CFL season ended, Good-Jones received a tryout from the Philadelphia Eagles. He was granted release by Calgary in January 2023 to pursue opportunities in the NFL, and afterwards was signed by the Eagles to a future contract.

References

1997 births
Living people
American football offensive guards
American football offensive tackles
American football centers
Players of American football from Iowa
Sportspeople from Cedar Rapids, Iowa
Iowa State Cyclones football players
Philadelphia Eagles players
Calgary Stampeders players
Canadian football guards